State Route 167 (SR 167) is a 60-mile-long route in the southeastern part of the state.  The southern terminus of the route is at the Florida state line, where State Road 79 (SR 79) crosses into Geneva County, Alabama.  The northern terminus of the route is at the junction with U.S. Route 231/SR 10 in Troy.

Route description
SR 167 passes through largely rural areas in southeastern Alabama.  Except for a brief stretch as the route passes through Enterprise, SR 167 travels on two-lane roads for the duration of its route.  It serves as an alternate route to US 231 for travellers heading to and from Panama City, Florida, and serves as an emergency access route during hurricane emergencies.

Major intersections

References

167
Transportation in Geneva County, Alabama
Transportation in Dale County, Alabama
Transportation in Coffee County, Alabama
Transportation in Pike County, Alabama
Enterprise, Alabama